Livio Trapè  (born 26 May 1937) is a former Italian cyclist. At the 1960 Olympics he won a gold medal in the team time trial and a silver medal in the individual road race. After that he turned professional and competed until 1966, albeit with little success.

References

1937 births
Living people
Italian male cyclists
Olympic gold medalists for Italy
Olympic silver medalists for Italy
Cyclists at the 1960 Summer Olympics
Olympic cyclists of Italy
Olympic medalists in cycling
Sportspeople from the Province of Viterbo
Cyclists from Lazio
Medalists at the 1960 Summer Olympics